CLADEM (or Committee for Latin America and the Caribbean for the Defense of Women's Rights) is an international NGO network of women’s organizations and activists. It was established  in San José, Costa Rica. It was developed after discussions in 1985 at the 3rd World Conference on Women of the United Nations in Nairobi where attendees noted a need for regionally based strategies in order to boost advocacy in Latin America and the Caribbean. The organisation was formally registered in 1989 in Lima in Peru. Since 1995, it has held Category II Consulting Status at the United Nations, and since 2002, it has participated in Organization of American States matters.

Notable members
Its board members include Susana Chiarotti who is an Argentine lawyer campaigning for women's rights.

References

External links
 Official website

Organizations established in 1987
Feminist organizations in South America
Organizations based in San José, Costa Rica
Feminist organizations in Costa Rica
Latin America and the Caribbean